Emil Baré, real name Emil Barach (8 September 1870 – 29 March 1943) was a Hungarian violinist.

Life 
Baré was born in Vienna from Hungarian Jewish parents. In 1886, at the age of 16, he renounced the Jewish faith and changed his surname Barach to Baré. He studied at the Universität für Musik und darstellende Kunst Wien with Joseph Hellmesberger Jr. and then at the Conservatoire de Paris with Lambert Massart. He then worked in Paris in the late 1890s as concertmaster of the Paris Opera. From 1897 to 1902 he was second concertmaster of the Chicago Symphony Orchestra. He also played in the Orchestre Lamoureux and worked at the opera houses in Mainz and Cologne. In spring 1903, he became concertmaster of the Hungarian State Opera House in Budapest and in 1910 teacher for violin and later professor at the Franz Liszt Academy of Music.

On 20 April 1916, Baré performed the solo violin in the first part of (Une idéale) and Two Portraits Op. 5 by Béla Bartók together with the Orchestra of the Budapest Opera conducted by István Strasser, the two movements being performed together for the first time.

Further reading 
 Aladár Schöpflin (ed.): Baré, Emil. In Magyar Színművészeti Lexikon (Ungarisches Lexikon der darstellenden Kunst). Országos Színészegyesület Nyugdíjintézete, Budapest 1929–1931, 1. vol., p. 126 (Numerized).
 Péter Újvári (ed.): Baré, Emil. In Magyar zsidó lexikon (Ungarisches jüdisches Lexikon). Budapest 1929, 3. vol.,  (Numerized).

References 

Academic staff of the Franz Liszt Academy of Music
Conservatoire de Paris alumni
Hungarian classical violinists
Concertmasters
Pseudonyms
1870 births
1943 deaths
 Musicians from Vienna